Microloma calycinum     is a species of plant in the family Apocynaceae that is native to the Namaqualand region, in the far north-west of South Africa, as well as southern Namibia.

References

External links
 
 

calycinum